Jamnagar Rural is one of the 182 Legislative Assembly constituencies of Gujarat state in India. It is part of Jamnagar district.

List of segments
This assembly seat represents the following segments,

 Jamnagar Taluka (Part) Villages – Sarmat, Gordhanpar, Khara Beraja, Dhinchda, Rozibet, Nava Nagna, Juna Nagna, Dhunvav, Khijadiya, Jambuda, Sachana, Rampar, Fala, Dhrangda, Khambhalida Nanovas, Khambhalida Motovas, Khijadiya Ravani, Ranjitpar, Khilos, Nani Banugar, Moti Banugar, Shekhpat, Khimrana, Naghedi, Vasai, Bed, Mungani, Gagva, Moti Khavdi, Nani Khavdi, Sapar, Amra, Ravalsar, Lakha Baval, Kansumara, Morkanda, Theba, Hapa, Bada, Suryapara, Lakhani Motovas, Lakhani Nanovas, Tamachan, Jamvanathali, Chavda, Moda, Gangajala, Alia, Mota Thavariya, Khimaliya, Dared, Masitiya, Champa Beraja, Jivapar, Gaduka, Balambhdi, Dodhiya, Vav Beraja, Chela, Dadiya, Mokhana, Suvarda, Vijarkhi, Sapda, Beraja, Jaga, Varna, Virpar, Veratiya, Khara Vedha, Sumri (Dhutarpar), Dhudasiya, Dhutarpar, Medi, Nani Matli, Pasaya, Modpar, Fachariya, Miyatra, Harshadpar, Naranpar, Changa, Chandragadh, Khoja Beraja, Lonthiya, Bavariya, Lavadiya, Naghuna, Nana Thavariya, Hadmatiya, Matva, Moti Bhalsan, Sumri (Bhalsan), Konza, Makvana, Dhandha, Chandraga, Vaniyagam, Vagadiya, Valupir (Kado), Vokatiyo (Kado), Gujh (Kado), Pirotan (Bet), Ravan (Kado), Magariyo (Kado), Panjavo (Kado), Kalyan (Kado), Idariyo (Kado), Dhokad (Kado), Sachana Megharva (Kado), Sikka (CT), Digvijaygram (CT), Bedi (CT), Vibhapar.
 Jodiya Taluka (Part) Villages – Jodiya, Badanpar (Jodiya), Kunad, Khavral (Kado), Balachadi, Khiri, Hadiyana, Baradi, Beraja, Vavdi, Nesda, Limbuda, Anada, Bhadra, Lakhtar.

Members of Legislative Assembly
 2007 - Laljibhai Solanki, Bharatiya Janata Party
 2012 - Raghavji Patel, Indian National Congress

Election results

2022

By Election-2019

2017

2012

References

External links
 

Assembly constituencies of Gujarat
Jamnagar district